Karancslapujtő is a village in Nógrád County, Hungary with 2,595 inhabitants (2014).

Populated places in Nógrád County